North Port is a city located in Sarasota County, Florida, United States. The population was 74,793 at the 2020 US Census. It is part of the North Port–Bradenton–Sarasota Metropolitan Statistical Area.  It was originally developed by General Development Corporation as the northern / Sarasota County portion of its Port Charlotte development, the other portion located in the adjacent Charlotte County. GDC dubbed the city North Port Charlotte, and it was incorporated under that name through a special act of the Florida Legislature in 1959.  By referendum in 1974, the city's residents approved a change to its name as North Port, dropping Charlotte from its name to proclaim the city as a separate identity. It is home to the Little Salt Spring, an archaeological and paleontological site owned by the University of Miami.

History

Archaeological digs at the Little Salt Spring show that what is now North Port was inhabited by pre-Columbian Native Americans. Evidence of their existence includes projectile points, a carved oak mortar, and a piece of a nonreturnable wooden boomerang. 

In 1954, the Mackle Brothers started the General Development Corporation with the intention of selling property in Florida to northerners. Not only would they plat and sell a majority of what is now North Port, the company's employees served on the city's first council. The city itself was incorporated in 1959.

After Hurricane Ian hit Florida in 2022, North Port would experience flooding.

Geography

North Port is a municipality containing large-scale residential subdivisions along with an extensive network of streets.  The municipality has annexed nearby locales, including the area known as Warm Mineral Springs, the location of a notable artesian spring, as well as its own significant residential subdivision.

Myakkahatchee Creek Environmental Park is in North Port.

Demographics

As of the 2020 US Census, there were 74,793 people and 25,592 households residing in the city. The racial makeup of the city was 87.5% White, 6.3% African American, 0.1% Native American, 2.1% Asian, and 3.2% from two or more races. Hispanic or Latino of any race were 8.5% of the population.

Of the 25,592 households, 4.8% of the population were under 5 years old, 18.6% were under 18 years old, and 26.7% were 65 years and older. 52.5% of the population was female.  

The median income for a household in the city was $64,543. The per capita income for the city was $34,514. About 7.0% of people were below the poverty line.

Economy

North Port is the Spring Training home for the Atlanta Braves, who hold extended spring training in North Port.

Arts and culture
In 1960, the American Police Hall of Fame & Museum was opened in North Port. The opening ceremony included remarks from the then Presidential candidate John F. Kennedy. The museum has since relocated, first to Miami, and then to the present location in Titusville, Florida.

In 2007, the North Port Art Guild leased a building from the city and established the North Port Art Center. The center hosts exhibits as well as classes.

Government

North Port has a city commission/city manager form of government.

The current city manager is A. Jerome Fletcher, II.  The city commission has five members.  The mayor/vice mayor roles are voted upon annually from the commission ranks.  The current commission includes Commissioner Pete Emrich (District 4), mayor Barbara Langdon (District 2), Commissioner Phil Stokes (District 5), Commissioner Debbie McDowell (District 3) and Vice-Mayor Alice White (District 1).

The city of North Port has its own police force, fire department, and waste management. City Hall of North Port is located at 4970 City Hall Boulevard.

Education

North Port has five elementary schools, one public charter school, two middle schools, one high school, and one college  operated by Sarasota County Public Schools.

 Toledo Blade Elementary School (K–5)
 Glenallen Elementary School (K–5)
 Cranberry Elementary School (K–5)
 Atwater Elementary School (K–5)
 Lamarque Elementary School (K–5)
 Imagine School at North Port (K–12)
 Heron Creek Middle School (6–8)
 Woodland Middle School (6–8)
 North Port High School (9–12)
 Suncoast Technical College

References

External links
 City of North Port

 
Cities in Sarasota County, Florida
Sarasota metropolitan area
Cities in Florida
Ukrainian communities in the United States
Populated places established in 1959
1959 establishments in Florida